The following is an episode list for the Serbian television series Državni posao (The State Job), which airs on Superstar TV (previously Radio Television of Vojvodina). The series premiered on 24 September 2012.

Season overview

Episodes

Season 1 (2012–2013)

Season 2 (2013–2014)

Season 3 (2014–2015)

External links 
 

Državni posao